The Fall 2021 Chicago House AC season is the club's first in the National Independent Soccer Association and first as a professional team.

Roster

Players

Staff

Transfers

In

Friendlies

Competitions

NISA Independent Cup 

Details for the 2021 NISA Independent Cup were released on June 10.

Standings

Matches

National Independent Soccer Association season 

Details regarding the Fall season were released on June 16.

Standings

Results summary

Matches

Squad statistics

Appearances and goals 

|-
! colspan="14" style="background:#dcdcdc; text-align:center"| Goalkeepers

|-
! colspan="14" style="background:#dcdcdc; text-align:center"| Defenders

|-
! colspan="14" style="background:#dcdcdc; text-align:center"| Midfielders

|-
! colspan="14" style="background:#dcdcdc; text-align:center"| Forwards

|-
|}

Goal scorers

Disciplinary record

References

External links 

 

Chicago House AC
Chicago House AC